The Portugal national rugby sevens team played for the first time in 1992, at the Catania Sevens, World Cup 1993 European Qualifier. The team plays in competitions such as the World Sevens Series, the European Sevens Grand Prix Series and the Rugby World Cup Sevens.
Portugal has a record of eight European titles—in 2002, 2003, 2004, 2005, 2006, 2008, 2010 and 2011—although Portugal has not made the semifinals since 2012.
Pedro Leal and Gonçalo Foro are two notable sevens players.

World Rugby Sevens Series 

Portugal were a core team at the World Rugby Sevens Series beginning with the 2012–13 season, but finished last among core teams in the 2015-16 World Series and were relegated. Since then, Portugal has not been in contention for promotion back to the World Series; their performance in the Rugby Europe Sevens Grand Prix has not been sufficiently strong for Portugal to reach the Hong Kong Sevens qualifying tournament.

Tournament history

Summer Olympics
Portugal has not qualified for the Summer Olympics.

Rugby World Cup Sevens

World Rugby Sevens Series

 1999–00: did not compete
 2000–01: 14th
 2001–02: 16th
 2002–03: 20th
 2003–04: 15th
 2004–05: 13th
 2005–06: 13th
 2006–07: 15th
 2007–08: 14th
 2008–09: 12th
 2009–10: did not compete
 2010–11: 13th
 2011–12: 15th
 2012–13: 14th
 2013–14: 14th
 2014–15: 14th
 2015–16: 16th (relegated)
 2016–17: did not compete

World Games

Sevens Grand Prix Series

Players

Notable players
Adérito Esteves
Pedro Leal
Gonçalo Foro

See also
 Rugby World Cup Sevens

References

External links
 
 Rugby Portugal
 Rugby7.com
 Portugal 7's results

  

National rugby sevens teams
sevens